Paul Weinstein  (5 April 1878; 16 August 1964) was a German athlete who competed in the early twentieth century. He was born in Wallendorf.

Weinstein won the bronze medal in Athletics at the 1904 Summer Olympics in the high jump. Samuel Jones won the gold medal and Garrett Serviss won silver. Weinstein also competed in the pole vault event and finished seventh.

References

External links 
 profile

1878 births
1964 deaths
19th-century German Jews
Place of birth missing
German male high jumpers
Olympic athletes of Germany
Olympic bronze medalists for Germany
Medalists at the 1904 Summer Olympics
Athletes (track and field) at the 1904 Summer Olympics
Athletes (track and field) at the 1906 Intercalated Games
Olympic bronze medalists in athletics (track and field)
Olympic male high jumpers